Savy may refer to:

People
 Bernard-Claude Savy (1922–1997), French physician, publisher and politician
 Honoré Savy (1725-1790)
 Jean Savy

Places
 Savy, Aisne, France
 Savy-Berlette, France

See also
 Savvy (disambiguation)